Look Homeward, Angel: A Story of the Buried Life is a 1929 novel by Thomas Wolfe. It is Wolfe's first novel, and is considered a highly autobiographical American coming-of-age story. The character of Eugene Gant is generally believed to be a depiction of Wolfe himself. The novel briefly recounts Eugene's father's early life, but primarily covers the span of time from Eugene's birth in 1900 to his definitive departure from home at the age of 19. The setting is a fictionalization of his home town of Asheville, North Carolina, called Altamont, Catawba, in the novel.

A restored version of the original manuscript of Look Homeward, Angel, titled O Lost, was published in 2000.

Genesis and publication history

Thomas Wolfe's father, William Oliver Wolfe, ordered an angel statue from New York and it was used for years as a porch advertisement at the family monument shop on Patton Avenue (now the site of the Jackson Building). W. O. Wolfe sold the statue to a family in Hendersonville, North Carolina in 1906. The angel was then moved to that town's Oakdale Cemetery. The boarding house run by Eugene Gant's mother, based on one run by Wolfe's mother, has been called "the most famous boardinghouse in American fiction."

The title of Thomas Wolfe's novel comes from the John Milton poem "Lycidas":

"Look homeward Angel now, and melt with ruth:And, O ye Dolphins, waft the hapless youth."(163–164)

Wolfe's original title was The Building of a Wall, which he later changed to O Lost.

Wolfe began the novel in 1926, intending to delve into "the strange and bitter magic of life." The novel was written over 20 months. Wolfe is often characterized as a romantic owing to the power of his emotionally charged, sprawling style. Look Homeward, Angel is written in a "stream of consciousness" narrative reminiscent of James Joyce.

On the novel's completion, Wolfe gave the vast manuscript to Scribner editor Maxwell Perkins. Perkins was impressed with the young author's talent, but requested that Wolfe rewrite the novel to a more publishable size. The two worked through it together, and after being trimmed by 60,000 words, the novel was published in 1929. Wolfe became insecure about the editing process after receiving criticism that the novel was Perkins's almost as much as his own. This led to an estrangement between the two, and Wolfe eventually left Scribner. Prior to his death in 1938, Wolfe made amends with Perkins. Writing in 1947, Perkins stated that he took the book "substantially as it was," and that "in truth, the extent of cutting ... has somehow come to be greatly exaggerated. Really, it was more a matter of reorganization."

Descriptions of Altamont are based on Wolfe's home town of Asheville, North Carolina, and the descriptions of people and family led to estrangement from many in his hometown. Though often regarded as a "sentimental tale of growing up," the novel is characterized by a "dark and troubling" depiction of the times, "full of loneliness, death, insanity, alcoholism, family dysfunction, racial segregation and a profoundly cynical view of World War I." Rarely named but frequently alluded to, the infectious disease tuberculosis (consumption) casts a "death’s-head shadow" over the novel. Wolfe later died of the disease.

O Lost, the original "author's cut" of Look Homeward, Angel, was reconstructed by scholars Arlyn and Matthew Bruccoli and published in 2000 on the centennial of Wolfe's birth. Matthew Bruccoli said that while Perkins was a talented editor, Look Homeward, Angel is inferior to the complete work of O Lost and that the publication of the complete novel "marks nothing less than the restoration of a masterpiece to the literary canon."

Plot
The book is divided into three parts, with a total of forty chapters. The first 90 pages of the book deal with an early biography of Gant's parents, very closely based on the actual history of Wolfe's own mother and father. It begins with his father, Oliver's, decision to become a stone cutter after seeing a statue of a stone angel.

Part One
The first marriage of Oliver Gant, father of the protagonist, Eugene, ends in tragedy, after which Oliver becomes an alcoholic; the battle with alcoholism remains the major struggle of his life. He eventually remarries, builds a new house, and starts a family. However, the couple is beset with tragedy: their first daughter dies of cholera in infancy, while two more babies die at birth. In the wake of these losses, a destabilized Oliver is sent to Richmond for a "cure" with little success. He returns home to abuse his family, at times threatening to kill his second wife Eliza (Eugene Gant's mother). The couple remain together, however, and have a total of six surviving children, the oldest born in 1894.

Eugene's birth follows a difficult labor during which his father, Oliver, is drunk downstairs. Nonetheless, Oliver Gant forms a special bond with his son, Eugene, from early on. He begins to get his drinking under control, with less frequent occasional binges, although his marriage becomes strained as Eliza's patience with him grows thinner. By the fifth chapter they are no longer sleeping in the same bedroom.

Despite his flaws, Oliver Gant is the family's keystone; he reads Shakespeare, has his daughter Helen read poetry, and keeps great fires burning in the house as symbols  of warmth for the family. His gusto is the source of energy and strength for the family. Even his raging diatribes against his wife sustain the tempo of domestic life. When Eugene is six years old and starting to school, Oliver journeys to California for the last time, returning home to the joy of his family. Eugene's early education includes several clashes with teachers but he has a love of books and is bright, much to the pride of both his parents. His mother continues to baby him, unwilling to see him grow up; she does not cut his hair, even though he is teased about its length by the other boys.

Part Two
Eugene wins a writing contest and is chosen to attend Altamont Fitting School. The school is run by John and Margaret Leonard. Here, Eugene begins his classical education. His mother, Eliza’s, boarding house, Dixieland, is paid off and she continues investing. Eugene’s siblings are traveling and experiencing both success and failure in their various undertakings. Oliver sells the stone angel to the owner of a local brothel. Eugene is ashamed by his first few sexual experiences. He is working at his brother, Ben’s, newspaper while continuing to study Shakespeare and Romantic poetry. WWI is underway. Ben is diagnosed with lung cancer in Baltimore. Despite the Leonard’s advice to wait, Eugene will attend UNC at Oliver’s insistence. 

Part Two deals primarily with Eugene’s education, both scholastically and real life experience. He is taken up by the new school principal, John Dorsey Leonard and wife, Margaret. They form a college prep academy and add Eugene to the student population at the cost of $100 per year, grudgingly provided by Eliza. He learns the basics from them both, but is prompted by Margaret to immerse himself in poetry and ancient drama. He becomes a son to them both.

Oldest Gant son, Stevie, is a braggart and an enterprising entrepreneur, albeit with rotting, painful teeth. Younger son, Luke, minus the dental ailment, seems to be following in his footsteps, both hustlers and conmen. Kind, gentle, brooding brother, Ben, grows close to Eugene and looks out for him.

Owing to wise investments in the progression of town development, the Gants’ worth in 1912 is about $100,000. Oliver’s bouts with prostate problems culminate with aborted surgery when he is diagnosed with terminal cancer.  Daughter Helen begins a career of touring and singing, drawing away from her closeness with Oliver. Eliza permanently moves to Dixieland, her boarding house. Gant sells one of his angels as a tomb monument.

Two extended segments involve stream of consciousness potpourris of various town types passing by the observer, one in a local bar and one in a walk about the town.  WWI begins, but Ben is rejected physically. Eugene has a chaperoned holiday in Charleston and nearly loses his virginity. He participates as Prince Hal in a botched Shakespearean festival. Helen marries Hugh Barton.

Oliver states he will finance Eugene’s college education, but only at the State University, to the chagrin and disappointment of the Leonards.

Part Three
Eugene begins his education at UNC as a teenage boy, alienated and out of place. He becomes the butt of practical jokes by the older fellow students. He works hard to become active in extracurricular activities including the debate club and philosophy association. After his freshman year, Eugene's summer back in Altamont is marked by him falling in love with a 21-year-old tenant—Laura James—at his mother's boarding house. Eugene became obsessed with Laura and at the end of the summer, she tells him that she is engaged to be married to a man in Norfolk, Virginia. Eugene falls into a funk which haunts him for another two years. W.O. undergoes radiation treatments at Johns Hopkins University Hospital in Baltimore because the Gant family operates with a conviction that only that medical institution was qualified to provide competent health care. (When Wolfe himself became ill in 1938, the family insisted he be sent to Baltimore to receive treatment at the only facility the Wolfe family trusted.) Eugene returns to UNC and becomes very involved in academic activities including serving as the editor of the school newspaper, the literary magazine, and the poetry publication. He joins a drama writer's seminar and achieves acclaim. His reputation on campus was a humorous eccentric which in turn made him funnier and more beloved. However, below this outward image was a young man who was intensely sensitive, lonely, and hyper-emotional. In the spring of 1918, his roommate unexpectedly died of heart disease, throwing Eugene into another funk. Then in the summer of 1918, Eugene worked at the shipyards at Norfolk, hoping to earn extra money for the upcoming school year, but this instead turns into a nightmare with him living homeless and famished for most of the summer. After returning to UNC in the fall of 1918, he is summoned by his mother to come home immediately because brother Ben is in a near coma with pneumonia. Thomas Wolfe's biographer Elizabeth Nowell said Wolfe's description of Ben's death was the finest writing of his career. Eugene returns to UNC and completes his studies. His mentor, English professor Vergil Weldon, modeled after Wolfe's mentor Horace Williams, encourages Eugene to apply to Harvard for graduate studies. He tells his mother of his plans; she begs him to remain in North Carolina and work for a newspaper. Eugene tells Eliza that he has a destiny elsewhere and that he cannot be boxed in by a small mountain town in North Carolina.

Critical reception
Look Homeward, Angel was published in 1929 to generally positive reviews in North America, most praising the author's brilliance and emotional power. One review called it a "sensation", and described it as having struck the literary world by storm. Despite the novel's enduring popularity, Wolfe's work has since come to be viewed by many literary critics (Harold Bloom and James Wood among them) as undisciplined and largely "formless autobiography". According to Jonathan W. Daniels, those critics wished that "Tom Wolfe's big sprawling powerful pouring prose would have been served in neater packages of sweeter stuff."

Adaptations and performances
Playwright Ketti Frings adapted the novel as a play of the same name. The play opened on Broadway at the Ethel Barrymore Theatre November 28, 1957, and ran for a total of 564 performances, closing on April 4, 1959. In 1958, Frings won the Pulitzer Prize for Drama and the New York Drama Critics' Circle Award for her adaptation of Wolfe's novel. The production received Tony Award nominations for Best Play; Best Actor in a Play (Hugh Griffith and Anthony Perkins); Best Actress in a Play (Jo Van Fleet); Best Scenic Design (Jo Mielziner); Best Costume Design (Motley); and Best Director (George Roy Hill).

Frings' adaptation of Look Homeward, Angel was readapted as a Broadway musical, Angel, which opened at the Minskoff Theatre in New York on May 4, 1978, and closed May 13 after five performances and poor reviews. Frings co-wrote the book with the show's lyricist, Peter Udell, whose lyrics were set to music by Gary Geld. This songwriting team had created the musicals Shenandoah and Purlie and penned the hit song "Sealed With a Kiss." Angel was directed by Philip Rose and choreographed by Robert Tucker. The production featured costumes by Pearl Somner, lighting design by John Gleason and scenery by Ming Cho Lee. For her performance in the show, Frances Sternhagen received a 1978 Tony Award nomination for Best Actress in a Musical. Additionally, Joel Higgins was nominated for a 1978 Drama Desk Award for Outstanding Featured Actor in a Musical.

Ketti Frings's screenplay was made into a TV movie, released by NBC in February 1972. The film was directed by Paul Bogart and starred Timothy Bottoms as Eugene Gant, E.G. Marshall as W.O. Gant, and Geraldine Page as Eliza.

In Season 2, Episode 11 Unidentified Female (December 2, 1995) of Touched by an Angel, the book is part of the story of a young man who returns home after making his own coming-of-age road trip. Monica is seen reading Wolfe's book, and she quotes a passage from the novel as eulogy for a story character who has died accidentally.

Related works
The film Genius (2016) is about Wolfe's life and his relationship with Maxwell Perkins from the moment Perkins received the manuscript from a colleague.

Bibliography

References

External links
 

1929 American novels
American autobiographical novels
Roman à clef novels
Southern Gothic novels
Novels by Thomas Wolfe
Novels set in North Carolina
American bildungsromans
American novels adapted into films
American novels adapted into plays
American novels adapted into television shows
1929 debut novels